Hendershott is a surname. Hendershott comes from the surname Hendershot.

Notable people with the surname include 

Adam Hendershott (born 1983), American actor
Anne Hendershott, American sociologist and author
Jen Hendershott (born 1971), American fitness competitor
Robert L. Hendershott (1898–2005), member of the American Numismatic Association Hall of Fame 

Also Henderschott 
 Frederick C. Henderschott (1870–1934), American journalist, educator, and executive

See also
Hendershot